Nikolay Vasiliev (born 28 March 1958, Grachyovsky District, Orenburg Oblast) is a Russian political figure and a deputy of the 6th, 7th, and 8th State Dumas.
 
After graduating from the State University of Management, Vasiliev worked at the Dolgoprudnenskoe Scientific Production Plant. Later he worked at the Government of the Moscow Oblast as an advisor to the deputy of the State Duma. From 2007 to 2011, he was the deputy of the Moscow Oblast Duma. In 2011, he became the deputy of the 6th State Duma. On September 18, 2016, he was elected deputy of the Moscow Oblast Duma. Since September 2021, he has served as deputy of the 8th State Duma.

References
 

 

1958 births
Living people
Communist Party of the Russian Federation members
21st-century Russian politicians
Eighth convocation members of the State Duma (Russian Federation)
Sixth convocation members of the State Duma (Russian Federation)
People from Orenburg Oblast